Ho Jong-hae (born 8 February 1975) is a North Korean short track speed skater. She competed in two events at the 1998 Winter Olympics.

References

1975 births
Living people
North Korean female short track speed skaters
Olympic short track speed skaters of North Korea
Short track speed skaters at the 1998 Winter Olympics
20th-century North Korean women